Neil Alexander Steven Brockdorff  (born 1958) is a Wellcome Trust Principal Research Fellow and professor in the department of biochemistry at the University of Oxford.  Brockdorff's research investigates gene and genome regulation in mammalian development. His interests are in the molecular basis of X-inactivation, the process that evolved in mammals to equalise X chromosome gene expression levels in XX females relative to XY males.

Education
Brockdorff was educated at Hampstead School, the University of Sussex (BSc) and the  University of Glasgow (PhD).

Career and research
X inactivation is an important model for understanding how epigenetic mechanisms, for example modification of DNA and histone proteins around which DNA is packaged, contribute to gene regulation in developmental biology. In earlier work Brockdorff demonstrated that an unusual functional RNA molecule, XIST, controls the X inactivation process.  Building on this finding he has elucidated key steps in XIST gene regulation during early development, and has defined major pathways through which XIST RNA induces chromosome wide gene silencing.

Awards and honours
Brockdorff is a member of the European Molecular Biology Organization (EMBO), a Fellow of the Royal Society (FRS), a Fellow of the Academy of Medical Sciences (FMedSci) and a Fellow of the Royal Society of Biology (FRSB).

References

Living people
Fellows of the Royal Society
Fellows of the Royal Society of Biology
Fellows of the Academy of Medical Sciences (United Kingdom)
Members of the European Molecular Biology Organization
Wellcome Trust Principal Research Fellows
Alumni of the University of Glasgow
Alumni of the University of Sussex
Academics of the University of Oxford
1958 births